Freedom2b is an Australian-based network that supports LGBT people from Christian backgrounds. It helps them resolve issues of faith, sexuality, and gender identity while working to promote understanding and acceptance both in the church and within the wider community. Freedom2b is not unlike many of the other denominational groups that have been created to assist people with resolving issues of faith and sexuality such as Acceptance or Integrity, but it accepts both religious and non religious LGBTI people and does not promote a particular belief system.

Purpose 

The stated agenda of Freedom2b is to offer support, information and the opportunity to share with people who have similar experiences. Freedom2b offers support to LGBTI people through face to face meetings and offers information on same sex attraction from a scientific, psychological and biblical perspective. It also promotes dialogue with religious organizations to promote understanding and acceptance.

History 

Freedom2b was co-founded in 2004 by Anthony Venn-Brown (a former Australian Assemblies of God evangelist) and Phillip Wall and the first meetings were held in Surry Hills in Sydney.  Anthony Venn-Brown released his autobiography A Life of Unlearning, which he said caused a flood of emails and prompted him to establish the network to give gay Christians a voice. “Up until this point there was no point of contact for the many thousands of people who were isolated.”

In 2011 Venn-Brown stepped down, with Michelle Kolev of the Melbourne chapter taking on the role of President. The year also saw the organisation re-brand from "freedom 2 b[e]" to "freedom2b".

Activities 

Freedom2b conducts monthly meetings in a number of capital cities including Sydney, Melbourne, and Brisbane, and has an online forum where participants can share their stories and discuss issues relating to faith and sexuality. Freedom2b has marched in the Sydney Mardi Gras since 2007 and participated in the 2011 Mardi Gras under the theme of “Find Freedom”.

The organization supports a range of activities within the community that promote awareness and help people reconcile their faith and sexuality.  The Australian Broadcasting Corporation interviewed a number of members of freedom2b members in 2009 on their experiences of being gay and Pentecostal, and several freedom2b members were also the subject of a 2009 photography exhibition by Iain Wallace entitled “Walking between Worlds.” Freedom2b has recently been involved in workshops on suicide prevention. Three members of freedom2b, Paul Martin, Anthony Venn-Brown, and Ben Gresham are featured in an upcoming documentary "The Bedroom Commandments" that looks at the relationship between religious faith and sexuality. 

Freedom2b also has a group for young people aged 18–30. Their aim is to offer a safe place for LGBTI youth and young adults from Christian backgrounds. 
The youth coordinators of freedom2b in 2008 are Ben Gresham in Sydney and Duane McKibben in Melbourne.
The patrons of freedom2b in 2008 are the Hon. Michael Kirby AC, CMG (a former justice of the High Court of Australia) and Reverend Dorothy McRae-McMahon.

References

External links 
 freedom2b.org - official website

LGBT Christian organizations
LGBT organisations in Australia
Evangelical parachurch organizations
Charismatic and Pentecostal organizations